Coal is mined in every state of Australia. The largest black coal resources occur in Queensland and New South Wales. About 70% of coal mined in Australia is exported, mostly to eastern Asia, and of the balance most is used in electricity generation. In 2019-20 Australia exported 390 Mt of coal (177 Mt metallurgical coal and 213 Mt thermal coal) and was the world's largest exporter of metallurgical coal and second largest exporter of thermal coal.

Coal mining in Australia has been criticized, due to carbon dioxide emissions during combustion. This criticism is primarily directed at thermal coal, for its connection to coal-fired power stations as a major source of carbon dioxide emissions, and the link to climate change in Australia and worldwide. Coal was responsible for 30% (164 million tonnes) of Australia's greenhouse gas (GHG) emissions, not counting methane and export coal, in 2019. Coal as a fuel was responsible for 41% (160 million tonnes) of carbon dioxide emissions in Australia in 2020.

The Carbon Pollution Reduction Scheme, which followed the draft report in the Garnaut Climate Change Review, placed a price on carbon emissions through a reducing cap and trade emissions trading scheme and incentivised against carbon pollution temporarily, before it was revoked in 2014. Despite a target to reduce GHG emissions Australia continues to open new coal mines.

Forms of coal
Australian coal is either high-quality bituminous coal (black coal) or lower-quality lignite (brown coal).

Bituminous coal is mined in Queensland and New South Wales. It is used for both domestic power generation and is exported. Mining is  underground or open-cut. The coal is transported by rail to power stations or export shipping terminals. 

Lignite is mined in Victoria and South Australia, and is of lower quality due to a lower thermal value largely caused by a high water content. Ash content varies significantly but some Australian lignites have relatively low ash content. In 2013 coal from three open cut lignite coal mines in Victoria was used for power generation.

History

Australian coal was first discovered in New South Wales by shipwreck survivors in August 1797, at Coalcliff, north of Wollongong.  George Bass discovered coal soon afterwards in the cliffs
at Newcastle off of Point Solander.  Coal exports first left Newcastle in 1799, with it being mined by convicts. Shipments left for India, marking Australia's first commodity export.  Mining in the area was initially small scale and used in domestic heating.

In Queensland, coal mining began near Ipswich in 1825. The following year coal was discovered at Cape Paterson in Victoria. It wasn't until the 1850s that the deposits were mined, however it wasn't enough to sustain Victorian communities. Coal was discovered in Tasmania at Plunkett Point in 1833. In Western Australia, the first coal deposits were discovered in 1846 at Irwin River in what is known as the Coalseam Conservation Park.

By the 1900s coal had become integral to the economy as it was used in locomotives on railways and in steam mills cutting logs, and grinding wheat. In New South Wales development was particularly influenced by coal during the 20th century.  During the 1940s Australian coal mines experienced significant strikes. The 1949 Australian coal strike lasted for seven weeks. The Joint Coal Board was formed to aid in the resolution of workers' disputes.  Before WWII underground mines dominated.  After WWII, Australia began exporting coking coal to Japan to aid in their production of steel. Exports to South Korea and Taiwan soon followed. Australia became the number one coal exporter in 1984. By 1986 Australia was supplying around half of all its exports to Japan.  As the Bowen Basin Coalfields were developed, open-cut mines became more common. From the 1980s onwards the ratio of thermal coal exported to Asia increased significantly.  High-grade coking coal extracted from the Illawarra region has supported a steel and steel products market with exports leaving via Port Kembla harbour. An anti-coal movement is a recent historical development.

Production, exports and reserves
In 2016, Australia was the biggest net exporter of coal, with 32% of global exports (389 Mt out of 1,213 Mt total). It was the fourth-highest producer with 6.9% of global production (503 Mt out of 7,269 Mt total). 77% of production was exported (389 Mt out of 503 Mt total).

Major export markets for Australian coal 

Australia exports the largest share of coal of any nation, at 54% of the total. In 2020, exports of coal accounted for 1% of national revenue, with a total value of A$55 billion.

Major coal export ports  

The Port of Newcastle, New South Wales, is the world's largest and most efficient coal handling operation through its two terminals: Carrington and Kooragang. Australia has nine major coal-export ports, including:

Major coal mining companies

Future planned coal mining 
Several new coal mines are planned for development in Australia. This includes Olive Downs mine, to be operated by Pembroke Resources, near Coppabella, Queensland. In 2021, the federal government agreed to loan the project $175 million (AUS) to begin the first stages of its development. In April 2022, the construction of the mine commenced. Production is expected to begin in 2023.

Divestment from coal 
Several mines have announced plans to wind-down operations in coal within set timeframes, alongside planned closures of coal power plants in Australia. This includes Werris Creek (2025).

In 2016 Glencore announced that Tahmoor Complex would be closed by 2019.  However, Glencore later sold the mine to SIMEC in 2018, who still operate it.

BHP planned to sell the Mt Arthur mine in 2022, but failed to attract a viable offer and decided to continue operations there until financial year 2030. 

In August 2022 BHP completed its sale of the BHP Mitsui Coal to Stanmore Resources.

Banks such as Westpac have introduced restrictions on lending for new thermal coal mines, including a limit of 6300 kilocalories per kilogram for new projects.

Environmental impacts

Both underground and open-cut mines generate significant environmental impacts, including modified topography, soil erosion, water pollution, air pollution and acid water drainage. The coal industry claims that extensive rehabilitation of areas mined helps to ensure that land capability, after coal mining, meets agreed and appropriate standards.

Coal is the principal fossil fuel used in power generation not only in Australia but in many other countries. Links between coal mining, coal burning, and climate change are being discussed widely in Australia.

On 27 November 2006 the Land and Environment Court of New South Wales judge Justice Nicola Pain made the decision to set aside the Director-General's acceptance of the Environmental Assessment for the Anvil Hill coal mine, on the grounds that it did not include a comprehensive greenhouse gas assessment, even though the proposed mining of coal was for export. However, on 7 June 2007 the planning minister for NSW Frank Sartor reversed this decision and approved the mine, attaching a list of 80 conditions to the mines operation including conservation offsets.

Protests against coal
One of the first protests against coal development occurred to the south of Sydney in the early 1970s.  Clutha Development wanted to build a new coal loading facility at Coalcliff. Coal was to be stored in heaps along the coast. Local activist, Judy Gjedsted, organised protests which successfully ended the proposal.

In November 2021, anti-coal protestors led by Blockade Australia disrupted activity at the world’s largest coal terminal, the Port of Newcastle, by abseilling from equipment and obstructing railway tracks. The protests lasted for 10 days and 17 people were arrested. 

The Carmichael mine run by Adani Group, planned since 2012 and opened in 2021, drew national and international opposition, both from climate activists and traditional owners. In August 2019, the government extinguished 1,385 hectares of Wangan and Jaggalingou native title in order to grant Adani title to the land. Protestor activity at the mine has included 40 people blocking the entrance of the mine, with two chaining themselves to a drum of reinforced concrete.

Environmental regulation of coal mining

The Australian commonwealth government is responsible for making policy on off-shore exploration of coal and resources, while the governments of the states and territories are responsible for policy on onshore exploration.

Commonwealth law
The main Commonwealth environmental laws potentially applicable to coal mining are the Environment Protection and Biodiversity Conservation Act 1999 (EPBC Act) and the Clean Energy Act 2011. The EPBC Act is triggered if a proposed action is likely to have a significant impact on a matter of national environmental significance, for example federally listed threatened species and groundwater impacts.

State laws

New South Wales
Relevant laws are mining law, land use planning law, biodiversity law and water law.

Pollution law
Coal mining requires a pollution control ('environment protection') licence under the Protection of the Environment Operations Act 1997 (NSW) if it exceeds the following thresholds set out in Schedule 1 of the Act: if it is mining, processing or handling of coal (including tailings and chitter) at underground mines or open cut mines and (a) it has a capacity to produce more than 500 tonnes of coal per day, or (b) it has disturbed, is disturbing or will disturb a total surface area of more than 4 hectares of land by: (i) clearing or excavating, or (ii) constructing dams, ponds, drains, roads, railways or conveyors, or (iii) storing or depositing overburden or coal (including tailings and chitter).

Queensland
In March, 2020, the Queensland Resources Council introduced safety protocols to promote the health of coal mine workers amidst the international spread of COVID-19. These included improvements to social distancing of workers, disallowing visitors from the public to enter the sites and checking the temperature of workers at mine site entries.

See also 

Carbon capture and storage in Australia
Coal companies of Australia
Coal phase out
Greenhouse Mafia
Hunter Valley Coal Chain
List of coal fired power stations in Australia
Mining in Australia
Mitigation of global warming in Australia
Coastal coal-carrying trade of New South Wales

References

External links 
 "Illawarra Coal" - An unofficial history of coal mining in the Illawarra
 Survey of Energy Resources 2007 for Australia